The 2017–18 Dhaka Premier Division Cricket League was an edition of the Dhaka Premier Division Cricket League, a List A cricket competition that was held in Bangladesh. It was the fifth edition of the tournament with List A status, although almost 35 seasons had been played before achieving the status. It started on 5 February 2018 and finished on 5 April 2018. Gazi Group Cricketers were the defending champions. Abahani Limited won the tournament, after beating Legends of Rupganj by 94 runs in the final Super League fixture.

The Bangladesh Cricket Board (BCB) held a draft system for players on 20 January 2018. Agrani Bank Cricket Club and Shinepukur Cricket Club were promoted from the Dhaka First Division Cricket League, replacing Partex Sporting Club and Victoria Sporting Club who were relegated in the previous tournament. Both newly promoted teams won their opening fixtures.

The first part of the tournament was played as a round-robin, before progressing to the championship and relegation phase. The Super League started on 24 March 2018 and the Relegation League started on 29 March 2018.

After the eleventh round of fixtures, Khelaghar Samaj Kallyan Samity had reached the Super League part of the tournament for the first time in their history. Abahani Limited, Legends of Rupganj, Prime Doleshwar Sporting Club, Gazi Group Cricketers and Sheikh Jamal Dhanmondi Club also joined Khelaghar Samaj Kallyan Samity in the Super League. On 30 March 2018, in the Super League fixture between Abahani Limited and Prime Doleshwar Sporting Club, Abahani Limited set a new record for the highest team total in List A cricket in Bangladesh, with 393/4.

The bottom three teams, Agrani Bank Cricket Club, Kala Bagan Krira Chakra and Brothers Union, faced each other in the relegation playoffs. In the first match of the Relegation League, Agrani Bank Cricket Club beat Kala Bagan Krira Chakra by six wickets, therefore relegating Kala Bagan Krira Chakra to the Dhaka First Division Cricket League for the next season. In the last match, Brothers Union beat Agrani Bank Cricket Club by 4 wickets, therefore relegating Agrani Bank Cricket Club.

Teams
The following teams competed:

 Abahani Limited
 Agrani Bank Cricket Club
 Brothers Union
 Gazi Group Cricketers
 Kala Bagan Krira Chakra
 Khelaghar Samaj Kallyan Samity
 Legends of Rupganj
 Mohammedan Sporting Club
 Prime Bank Cricket Club
 Prime Doleshwar Sporting Club
 Sheikh Jamal Dhanmondi Club
 Shinepukur Cricket Club

Points tables

Group stage

 Team qualified for the Super League phase of the tournament

Super League

 Champions

Relegation League

 Team relegated to the Dhaka First Division Cricket League

Fixtures

Round robin

Round 1

Round 2

Round 3

Round 4

Round 5

Round 6

Round 7

Round 8

Round 9

Round 10

Round 11

Super League

Relegation League

References

External links
 Series home at ESPN Cricinfo

2017-18
Dhaka Premier Division Cricket League
2018 in Bangladeshi cricket
Bangladeshi cricket seasons from 2000–01